Davis Contractors Ltd v Fareham Urban District Council [1956] UKHL 3 is an English contract law case, concerning the frustration of an agreement.

Facts 
Davis Contractors agreed with Fareham UDC to build 78 houses over eight months for £92,425. It ended up taking 22 months because Davis was short of labour and materials and cost £115,223. Davis submitted the contract was frustrated and void and therefore they were entitled to quantum meruit for the value of work done.

Judgment 
The House of Lords held that although the performance of the contract had become more onerous, it was not frustrated. Lord Reid argued that saying frustration was an implied term was fanciful because people do not write about unforeseeable events. Instead, he wrote the following:

Lord Radcliffe concurred with the result:

Another argument that failed was that an express term was incorporated that the agreed price was binding only if there were in fact adequate supplies of labour and materials.

Australian law 
Lord Radcliffe's test was approved by the High Court of Australia in Codelfa Construction Pty Ltd v State Rail Authority of NSW.

See also
English contract law
Frustration in English law

References

House of Lords cases
1956 in case law
1956 in British law
Fareham
English frustration case law